Kacice  is a village in the administrative district of Gmina Słomniki, within Kraków County, Lesser Poland Voivodeship, in southern Poland.

The village has a population of 383.

References

Kacice